Kārķi parish is an administrative unit of Valka Municipality, Latvia. Prior to the 2009 administrative reforms it was part of Valka District.

Towns, villages and settlements of Kārķi Parish

References 

Parishes of Latvia
Valka Municipality